Jesus the Jew: A historian's reading of the Gospels (1973) is a book by Géza Vermes, who was a Reader in Jewish Studies at the University of Oxford when it was written. It was originally published by Collins in London.

Review citations and excerpts
Review:  Publishers Weekly, September 13, 1993, volume 240, issue 37, page 36
Review:  The Christian Century, September 16, 1981, volume 98, page 916
"Fortress picked this book up from the dying Collins firm; it has a 1973 publication date in England. The author has written on the Dead Sea Scrolls, but in this book his main interest is to give a Jewish Portrait of Jesus in his environment. Elaborate reference materials at the back of the book reinforce his arguments and lead readers beyond his significant beginnings. His Jesus is a very recognizable zaddik, a just man, a teacher, an exemplar."
Review:  CHOICE: Current Reviews for Academic Libraries May 1979, page 406
Review:  CHOICE: Current Reviews for Academic Libraries October 1974, page 1157
Review:  Library Journal, January 1, 1979, volume 104, page 116
Review:  Library Journal, July 1974, page 1832
Review:  Interpretation April 1976, page 206
Review:  The Journal of Religion January 1976, page 134
Review:  Commonweal, December 6, 1974, page 244
Review:  America, July 27, 1974, page 38
Review:  The Christian Century June 5, 1974, page 620
"Already regarded as a turn-in-the-road book, this historical study eschews most theological elements and jolts Christian readers into relocating Jesus in his original Jewish environment. Positive thinking about an often forgotten context; readable by nonspecialists."
Review:  Encounter March 1974, page 64
Review:  Times Literary Supplement December 7, 1973 page 1516

1973 non-fiction books
History books about Judaism
Books about Jesus